Acosmeryx socrates is a moth of the family Sphingidae. It is known from the Philippines.

References

Acosmeryx
Moths described in 1875
Moths of the Philippines